Great and Little Preston is a civil parish in the City of Leeds metropolitan borough, West Yorkshire, England. In 2001 census it had a population of 1,449, and 1463 in the 2011 census. It sits within the Leeds City Council ward of Garforth and Swillington.

See also
Listed buildings in Great and Little Preston

References

External links
Great and Little Preston Parish Council

Places in Leeds
Civil parishes in West Yorkshire